A Love Hate Masquerade is the final album from Kids in the Way. A music video was made for the song "Fiction".

Track listing
"Your Demon"
"Better Times"
"The Innocence"
"Letting Go"
"My Little Nightmare"
"Far From Over"
"Sugar"
"We Kill at Twilight"
"Winter Passing"
"Fiction"
"Farewell"

References

2007 albums
Kids in the Way albums
Flicker Records albums